Indrajaalam is a 1990 Indian Malayalam-language crime thriller film produced and directed by Thampi Kannanthanam and written by Dennis Joseph. The film stars Mohanlal, Rajan P. Dev and Geetha, with music composed by S. P. Venkatesh. It was released on 3 September 1990. The Film became major commercial success and was major breakthrough for Rajan P Dev for his villain character Carlos.

Plot 

The plot revolves around the uprising of an underworld gangster.

Cast 
Mohanlal as Kannan Nair
Rajan P. Dev as Carlos
A. T. Jose IPS (Retd) as Commissioner David
Vijayan Karote as Home minister K. G. Menon
Anupam Kher as Maharashtra Chief Minister
Geetha as Jayanthi
Vijayaraghavan as Thankappan
Mohan Jose as Michael
Sreeja as Vinu
Jose Prakash as Baba
K. P. A. C. Sunny as Adv.Narayana Swamy
Sathaar as Chandrakumar
Kunchan as Appu
Prathapachandran as Baburaj
Sainuddin as Kuttan
Meenakumari as Mariyamma
Balan K. Nair as Ayyappan Nair
Ravi Menon as Ravi, Press Photographer

Production 
Action choreographer Sham Kaushal debuted with this film, who signed on in May 1990. One of Dennis Joseph's acquittances, Kennedy had recommended Rajan P. Dev to him after the success of the theatre play Kattukuthira. Thilakan was initially considered for the role of Carlos. However, they then decided to cast a new actor for the role. When they contacted Nana magazine, they recommended Rajan P. Dev for the role and he was eventually cast. Filming took place mostly in Bombay.

Soundtrack 
The soundtrack was composed by S. P. Venkatesh.

Release and reception 
Indrajaalam was released on 3 September 1990, Onam day. N. Krishnaswamy of The Indian Express wrote, "High-speed cameras, sensitive film, innovative choreography of action and use of newfangled props have helped in this direction". Despite facing competition from three other Onam releases – Arhatha, Iyer the Great and Oliyampukal – it emerged the bigger success.

References

External links 
 

1990 crime thriller films
1990 films
1990s Malayalam-language films
Films about organised crime in India
Indian crime thriller films
Indian gangster films
Films shot in Mumbai
Fictional portrayals of the Maharashtra Police
Films directed by Thampi Kannanthanam